Jeon Yeo-ok (born April 9, 1959) is a conservative female South Korean politician who came from a journalist background. Of a pro-Lee Myung-bak background, she is known for expressing unsatisfying discontent against Park Geun-hye who regained control of the Saenuri Party (formally the Grand National Party). She was not nominated during the party nomination process for the 2012 legislative election as one of the close supporters of Lee Myung-bak. Until then, she was considered as the main rival of Park Geun-hye.

Controversy

Academic Elitism
Jeon was known for expressing in favor of academic elitism, as she openly opposed the nomination of the former president Roh Moo-hyun who did not graduate from a higher level institution.

Bibliography
Jeon, Yeo-ok, 일본은 없다, 지식공작소 (November 1, 1993), 
Jeon, Yeo-ok, 여성이여 테러리스트가 되라, 푸른숲 (November 30, 1995), 
Jeon, Yeo-ok, 여성이여, 느껴라 탐험하라, 푸른숲 (November 30, 1997), 
Jeon, Yeo-ok, 간절히@두려움 없이, 푸른숲 (December 31, 1999), 
Jeon, Yeo-ok, 삿포로에서 맥주를 마시다, 해냄 (July 25, 2003),

References

1959 births
Ewha Womans University alumni
Living people
Lee Myung-bak
People from Seoul
South Korean writers
South Korean Roman Catholics
South Korean anti-communists
Sogang University alumni
Liberty Korea Party politicians
South Korean journalists
South Korean women journalists
People involved in plagiarism controversies
Members of the National Assembly (South Korea)
Female members of the National Assembly (South Korea)